Bidi can refer to

 Bidi (settlement), a settlement in the Belgaum district, India
 Bidirectional text or bidi writing, mixing left-to-right and right-to-left scripts
 Beedi or Bidi, a thin, Indian cigarette
 Bidi, a town in the Malaysian state of Sarawak
 Bidi Bidi Refugee Settlement in Uganda
Bidi River, a river in the Democratic Republic of the Congo